Viktor Živojinović (born 15 March 1999) is a Serbian professional footballer who plays as a winger for Jedinstvo Ub on loan from Radnički Niš.

References

External links
 
 
 

1999 births
Living people
Footballers from Belgrade
Association football wingers
Serbian footballers
FK Voždovac players
FK Proleter Novi Sad players
FK Radnički Niš players
Serbian SuperLiga players
Serbia under-21 international footballers